List of films produced in the Cinema of Poland in the 1980s.

External links
 Polish film at the Internet Movie Database

1980